Michael Jeffrey Ramsey (born March 29, 1954) is a former Major League Baseball infielder. He attended Appalachian State University.

Career
Ramsey played for Roswell High School. He was drafted in the 26th round of the 1972 amateur draft by the Chicago Cubs, but did not sign. In 1975, Ramsey was again drafted, this time in the 3rd round by the St. Louis Cardinals. He spent the next several years coming up through the Cardinals minor league farm system with stops in Johnson City, Arkansas, and Springfield, Illinois. Ramsey eventually made his Major League debut with the Cardinals on September 4, 1978, and would play his final game with the Los Angeles Dodgers on May 30, 1985.

Ramsey was a member of the 1982 World Series Champion Cardinals team. In the series he went 0-for-1 with a run scored.

References

External links
, or Retrosheet
Pura Pelota (Venezuelan Winter League)

1954 births
Living people
American expatriate baseball players in Canada
Appalachian State Mountaineers baseball players
Appalachian State University alumni
Arkansas Travelers players
Baseball players from Virginia
Charlotte O's players
Edmonton Trappers players
Fort Myers Sun Sox players
Johnson City Cardinals players
Las Vegas 51s managers
Los Angeles Dodgers players
Major League Baseball second basemen
Major League Baseball shortstops
Montreal Expos players
Sportspeople from Roanoke, Virginia
People from Roswell, Georgia
Springfield Redbirds players
St. Louis Cardinals players
Tigres de Aragua players
American expatriate baseball players in Venezuela